Temple of the Eighteen Lords is a yin miao (temple for deceased people) located in Ganhua Village, Shimen District, New Taipei, Taiwan. Located on Provincial Highway 2 beside Jinshan Nuclear Power Plant, the temple is dedicated to seventeen deceased sailors and one dog.

History 
According to legend, during the Qing Dynasty, a boat carrying seventeen people and one dog capsized near the coast of northern Taiwan. All of the people died, but the dog survived. When residents on the shore were burying the dead, the dog jumped into the grave to be buried as well. Locals then immortalized them collectively as the "Eighteen Lords".

The grave was maintained by the Lian family (練) living in Ganhua Village. In the 1960s, a small shrine was built at the grave, and in 1975, the Lian family built a larger temple for the eighteen spirits. At the time, temples must worship one of the forty-seven deities recognized by the government to register as a legal entity, so the Lian marked it as a temple for Guanyin, who has a smaller altar besides the Eighteen Lords. Though this restriction was later lifted, temple officials said that they don't plan on changing its registration.

In the 1980s, the temple was popular among gamblers playing  (a type of illegal lottery) and sex workers. That led to food stalls flocking into the temple parking lot to cater to the visitors. According to Shimen District mayor Wu Zong-ren, there were roughly one hundred stalls outside the temple during its peak. In particular, the makeshift market's zongzi became very famous: a stall named "Liu's Zongzi" grew into a chain store with branches throughout Taipei. The temple's popularity diminished when Provincial Highway 2 was moved northwards onto a wider bridge, which redirected the traffic away from the temple and blocked its view of the ocean. 

In 1994, a new temple was built in the hills above Jinshan Nuclear Power Plant. The new temple has a very large dog statue overlooking the ocean, and visitors can walk inside it and climb to the dog's eyes.

Worship 
As a yin miao, the Temple of the Eighteen Lords is popular among people involved with the underworld of society, particularly gamblers and sex workers. Both temples have many statues of dogs, and touching them is said to attract wealth, as shown in a local saying: 

According to tradition, hot food must be given to the eighteen lords since they died at sea. This is why the stalls outside the temple mostly sell hot food like zongzi, stewed whelk, sticky rice, and sesame oil chicken. Some people also bring cigarettes. Worshippers also claim that the temple's "powers" are stronger at night.

See also 
 Yin Miao
 Changfu Temple, Sanxia District
 Dharma Drum Mountain, Jinshan District
 List of temples in Taiwan
 Dogs in religion

Notes

References 

Temples in New Taipei
1975 establishments in Taiwan
Religious buildings and structures completed in 1975
Taoist temples in Taiwan